Penthouse Serenade is an instrumental jazz quartet album by Nat King Cole.  It was released initially as a 10-inch LP in September, 1952, on Capitol Records.  An expanded (12 track) version was reissued in 1955 and a 19 track version (13-19 being vocal tracks) was reissued in 1998.

Track listing
original 1952 10 inch LP album release:
"Penthouse Serenade (When We're Alone)" (Val Burton, Will Jason) – 3:06 
"Somebody Loves Me" (Buddy DeSylva, George Gershwin, Ballard MacDonald) – 3:03 
"Laura" (Johnny Mercer, David Raksin) – 2:43 
"Once in a Blue Moon" (Anne Caldwell, Jerome Kern based on Rubenstein's Melody In F) – 2:55 
"Polka Dots and Moonbeams" (Johnny Burke, Jimmy Van Heusen) – 3:03 
"Down by the Old Mill Stream" (Tell Taylor) – 2:18 
"If I Should Lose You" (Ralph Rainger, Leo Robin) – 3:11 
"Rose Room" (Art Hickman, Harry Williams) – 2:46 
4 tracks added for the 1955 12 inch LP re-issue:
"I Surrender Dear" (Harry Barris, Gordon Clifford) – 2:57 
"It Could Happen to You" (Burke, Van Heusen) – 2:46 
"Don't Blame Me" (Dorothy Fields, Jimmy McHugh) – 3:02 
"Little Girl" (Francis Henry, Harry Hyde) – 1:48 
additional bonus tracks added to later 1998 CD release:
"I Surrender Dear" (Barris, Clifford) (alt. take) – 3:00 
"Walkin' My Baby Back Home" (Fred E. Ahlert, Roy Turk) – 2:11 
"Too Marvelous for Words" (Johnny Mercer, Richard Whiting) – 1:53 
"Too Young" (Sylvia Dee, Sidney Lippman) – 2:32 
"That's My Girl" (Duke Ellington, Barbara Tobias) – 1:45 
"It's Only a Paper Moon" (Harold Arlen, Yip Harburg, Billy Rose) – 2:09 
"Unforgettable" (Irving Gordon) – 3:05

Personnel
 Nat King Cole - piano, vocals
 John Collins - guitar
 Jack Costanzo - bongos, congas
 Charlie Harris - bass
 Norris "Bunny" Shawker - drums
 Lee Young - drums 
Production
 Lee Gillette - producer
 Michael Cuscuna - reissue producer
 Will Friedwald - liner notes

References
Allmusic [ album review link]
Capitol 94504

1952 albums
Nat King Cole albums
Capitol Records albums